Michael L. Young is an American government official. He served as the acting United States Secretary of Agriculture from January 20, 2017, when Donald Trump took office as President of the United States, to April 25, 2017, when the United States Senate confirmed Sonny Perdue as the new secretary. Young has been director of the United States Department of Agriculture (USDA) Office of Budget and Policy Analysis since October 2010, and has served for 25 years in that office, and has previously served in other positions within the department. He has a bachelor of science degree in botany from Colorado State University and a master of business administration degree from George Washington University.

References

External links

Year of birth missing (living people)
Living people
Colorado State University alumni
George Washington University School of Business alumni
Trump administration cabinet members
Young
United States Secretaries of Agriculture
United States Deputy Secretaries of Agriculture